Kosmos 115 ( meaning Cosmos 115) or Zenit-2 No.35 was a Soviet, first generation, low resolution, optical film-return reconnaissance satellite launched in 1966.

Kosmos 115 was launched by a Vostok-2 rocket flying from Site 31/6 at the Baikonur Cosmodrome. The launch took place at 10:48 GMT on 20 April 1966, and following its successful arrival in orbit the spacecraft received its Kosmos designation; along with the International Designator 1966-033A and the Satellite Catalog Number 02147.

After eight days in orbit, Kosmos 115 was deorbited, with its return capsule descending under parachute and landing at 09:07 GMT on 28 April 1966 and the capsule was recovered by Soviet force. There was abnormal operation of a SA-10 camera. Due to a camera malfunction, the satellite failed to take all of the images it had been programmed to produce.

References

Kosmos satellites
Spacecraft launched in 1966
Spacecraft which reentered in 1966
Zenit-2 satellites
1966 in the Soviet Union